The Gravedancers is a 2006 American horror film. It was chosen as one of the 8 Films To Die For in 2006 and screened at that year's After Dark Horrorfest film festival.

Plot
An unidentified young woman, alone in a room, is attacked by an invisible assailant, who hangs her in the stairway of her house. As she dies, she drops an ornate black envelope.

A year later, former college friends Sid (Marcus Thomas), Kira (Josie Maran), and Harris (Dominic Purcell) go out drinking after a funeral. They break into the Crescent View Cemetery to say their final goodbyes to the departed. Continuing their revelries, they get quite drunk. Sid finds a black envelope tucked behind a garland of flowers at the grave. It contains a poem urging those present to be joyful and to dance upon the graves. In their drunken state, the three regard this as a celebration of life, and they dance.

Afterwards, mysterious things happen. Harris and his wife Allison (Clare Kramer) are frightened by unexpected visions and odd sounds. Then Kira is attacked by a demonic force. She is severely bitten and sexually assaulted, and her house is ransacked. Sid is plagued by unexpected fires. They enlist a pair of paranormal investigators, Vincent Cochet (Tchéky Karyo) and Frances Culpepper (Megahn Perry), who determine that the three friends inadvertently invoked a powerful curse by dancing on the graves. They are now being haunted by three wayward spirits—a passionate axe murderer, a child pyromaniac, and a serial killer and rapist—who will kill them at the next full moon.

As the full moon approaches, they return to the cemetery to disinter the remains of their tormenters, hoping to bury them anew and put the curse to rest. Not all of the critical parts make it back into the ground, however, and on the final night the three friends experience renewed attacks, more powerful and furious than any previously. They are trapped together with the investigators by the malevolent spirits. Sid is incinerated by his firebug ghost, and Kira is murdered and her body is possessed by the axe murderer who is pursuing Harris.

Under duress, Culpepper admits that she foiled the burial plan by hiding the skulls of the corpses, the better to gather hard evidence of ghostly activity. Culpepper is then killed with an axe to the chest. Harris takes the axe murderer's skull and tries to return it to its body to break the curse. He helps Allison escape the house through an attic window.

The spiritual force in the house coalesces into the form of a demonic head. Smashing through the walls and out of the house, it pursues the characters' fleeing vehicle. Barely eluding the head, Allison and Harris return the skull to its corpse, and the raging spirits disappear.

Later, Allison and Harris walk through the cemetery after the funerals of their friends. As they leave, the groundskeeper carefully places an ornate black envelope on one of the tombstones.

Cast
Dominic Purcell as Harris Mckay 
Clare Kramer as Allison Mitchell
Josie Maran as Kira Hayden
Marcus Thomas as Sid Vance 
Tchéky Karyo as Vincent Cochet 
Megahn Perry as Frances Culpepper

Production 
Production on the film began in North Carolina during the winter, and lasted six weeks. After numerous false starts and shifting studios, director Mike Mendez opted to finance the film independently, leaving a six year gap in between his first film, The Convent, and The Gravedancers.

Release
The Gravedancers first debuted at the Fantasia Film Festival on July 15, 2006. It was officially released on November 17, 2006 by After Dark Films and Freestyle Releasing as a part of the 8 Films to Die For series.

Versions
The film was distributed on DVD by Lionsgate on March 27, 2007.

Reception 
On review aggregator Rotten Tomatoes, The Gravedancers holds an approval rating of 100% based on 7 reviews, with an average rating of 7.10/10.

See also
List of ghost films

References

External links
 
 

2006 films
2006 horror films
2000s serial killer films
2000s ghost films
2000s supernatural horror films
American supernatural horror films
Films about curses
Films about spirit possession
Films scored by Joseph Bishara
2000s English-language films
2000s American films